"One of the Few" is a song by the British progressive rock band Pink Floyd. It was released as the third track on The Final Cut album in 1983. The song is 1 minute and 12 seconds long. It features a ticking clock in the background and a steady drumbeat. The melody features most of the D minor scale. The lyrics describe a war veteran's return from the battlefield (specifically a pilot from the Battle of Britain, commonly known as The Few) to pursue teaching. The ticking clock continues to the next track, "The Hero's Return", which is sung from the veteran's perspective. This is one of the rejected songs from The Wall, and its working title was "Teach".

The lyrics "Make 'em laugh, Make 'em cry" in the third and final verse of the song is reprised in the third verse of "Not Now John" which is the twelfth track on The Final Cut.

Reception
In a retrospective review for The Final Cut, Rachel Mann of The Quietus described "One of the Few" as "plaintive and consciously echoes Wilfred Owen's poem The Send Off, with its talk of siding sheds and the trains ready to take young men to their deaths."

Personnel 
 Roger Waters – vocals, acoustic guitar, synthesizer, bass guitar

References

1983 songs
Pink Floyd songs
Songs written by Roger Waters
Song recordings produced by Roger Waters